Crveni Krst (Cyrillic: Црвени Крст, "Red Cross") may refer to:

 Crveni Krst, Belgrade, an urban neighborhood of the city of Belgrade, Serbia, in the municipality of Vračar
 Crveni Krst, Niš, a municipality of the city of Niš, Serbia
 Crveni Krst (neighborhood), an urban neighborhood of the city of Niš, Serbia, center of the municipality of the same name
 Crveni Krst concentration camp, a concentration camp which operated in Serbia from 1941 to 1944
 The Red Cross of Serbia

See also 
 Red Cross (disambiguation)